Froduald Karamira (14 August 1947 – 24 April 1998) was a Rwandan politician who was found guilty of crimes in organising the implementation of the 1994 Rwandan genocide. He was sentenced to death by a Rwandan court and was one of the last 22 individuals executed by Rwanda.

Political career
Karamira was born in Mushubati, Gitamara, Rwanda into a Tutsi family. As an adult, Karamira was accepted as a Hutu by following certain Rwandan traditions that allow "conversions" from one group to the other.

Karamira became Second Vice President of the MDR party and was a leader in the extremist wing of the party, nicknamed "Hutu Power".

After the murder of Burundian president Melchior Ndadaye on 21 October 1993, Karamira gave a public speech during which he coined the concept of "Hutu Power". He called on Hutus "to rise [and] take the necessary measures", and to "look within ourselves for the enemy which is amongst us".

Rwandan genocide
On 8 April 1994, after the death of Hutu President Juvénal Habyarimana when his plane was shot down, Karamira participated in the creation of the interim government. During the genocide, Karamira gave daily speeches that were broadcast on the Mille Collines radio station. After the Tutsi Rwandan Patriotic Front defeated the government in July 1994 and the genocide ended, Karamira disappeared from Rwanda. He was indicted by the government of Rwanda for genocide, murder, conspiracy, and non-assistance to people in danger.

Extradition standoff
In June 1996, Karamira was arrested by Indian officials in Mumbai and was extradited to Rwanda. However, Karamira managed to escape from his guards in the airport of Addis Ababa, but was recaptured several days later. This was brought to the attention of Richard Goldstone, the chief prosecutor for the ICTR, who requested the Ethiopian authorities to send Karamira to the ICTR in Arusha instead. Although Ethiopia was obligated to comply with Goldstone under international law, Goldstone gave in after Rwanda threatened to suspend all cooperation with the ICTR.

Trial, and execution
His trial began on 13 January 1997 in Kigali. In addition to his daily speeches that incited genocide, it was claimed that he was instrumental in creating and arming the Interahamwe militias; he was also accused of being personally responsible for the killing of hundreds of Tutsis, including 13 members of his own family.

On 14 February 1997, Karamira was convicted on all counts and sentenced to death by firing squad. He appealed to the Kigali Appeals Court, but the appeal was rejected and his sentence confirmed on 12 September 1997. On 24 April 1998, in a public event at the Nyamirambo Stadium in Kigali, Karamira and several others were executed by firing squad for their involvement in the Rwandan genocide. A total of 22 genocide convicts were executed in different locations across the country.

Rwanda abolished capital punishment in 2007. The 22 people who were executed in 1998, including Karamira, were the last to have been executed in Rwanda.

Notes

References
Linda Melvern (2004). Conspiracy to Murder: The Rwandan Genocide (New York: Verso)

External links
Ministère Public c. Karamira : trial judgment of Karamira's case (French)
Ministère Public c. Karamira : appeal judgment of Karamira's case (French)

1947 births
1998 deaths
20th-century executions by Rwanda
Executed politicians
Executed Rwandan people
Rwandan genocide perpetrators
Rwandan people convicted of murder
Rwandan people convicted of genocide
Rwandan politicians convicted of crimes
People convicted of murder by Rwanda
National Republican Movement for Democracy and Development politicians
Hutu people
People from Rutsiro District
People extradited from India
People extradited to Rwanda
People executed by Rwanda by firing squad
People executed for crimes against humanity
Executed mass murderers